Leon Abgarovich Orbeli (Levon Abgari Orbeli; , Levon Abgarovich Orbeli;  – 9 December 1958) was an Armenian physiologist active in the Russian SFSR. He was a member of the Academies of Science of USSR and Armenian SSR (the latter was founded by his brother Joseph Orbeli). Leon Orbeli became director of the Institute of Physiology in 1950.

Orbeli played an important part in the development of evolutionary physiology and wrote more than 200 works on experimental and theoretical science, 130 of them journal articles.

Career
Levon (or Leon) Orbeli was born in Tsaghkadzor, Armenia (then Darachichag, Yerevan Governorate, Russian Empire). He graduated from the Gymnasium in Tbilisi in 1899 and entered the Imperial Military Medical Academy in St. Petersburg. While still a student in the second course he began to work in the laboratory of Ivan Petrovich Pavlov (1849–1936). For the next thirty-five years, Orbeli's life and scientific career were closely connected with the work of Pavlov.

Orbeli graduated from the Military Medical Academy in 1904 and became an intern at the Nikolai Hospital in Kronstadt, the Naval Hospital in St. Petersburg. This gave him the opportunity to continue his experimental research in Pavlov's laboratory.

Orbeli's scientific career was spent in the leading Russian physiological centres, and he joined Pavlov in 1907, at the very height of Pavlov's research on conditioned reflexes. He was Pavlov's assistant in the Department of Physiology at the Institute for Experimental Medicine from 1907 to 1920.

From 1918-1946 he was head of the Department for Physiology of the State Institute for Science Research P. F. Lesgaft, located at the Petrograd Scientific Institute in the Biological Station in Koltushi. Orbeli was professor of physiology at the First Leningrad Medical Institute from 1920 to 1931, and from 1925 to 1950 professor of physiology at the Military-Medical Academy. He was head of the latter from 1943 to 1950.

Orbeli worked for two years abroad, with Karl Ewald Konstantin Hering (1834–1918) in Germany, John Newport Langley (1852–1925) and Joseph Barcroft (1872–1947) in England, and at the Marine Biological Station in Naples. After Pavlov's death in 1936, Orbeli, now Russia's most prominent scientist, was appointed director of the Pavlov Institute. From 1939 to 1946 he was secretary to the Department of Biological Science and vice president of the Academy of Sciences of the USSR.

In 1956 Orbeli organized the I. M. Sechenov Institute of Evolutionary Physiology and headed this institution until 1958. It was later renamed I. M. Sechenov Intstitute of Evolutionary Physiology and Biochemistry of the Academy of Sciences of the U.S.S.R. In 1935 he was elected an active member of the Academy of Sciences of the U.S.S.R. In 1945 he was awarded the title of Hero of Socialist Labor. He held the rank of Colonel General.

References

The contribution of academician Leon Abgarovich Orbeli and his school to the development of physiology of extreme conditions
Leon Abgarovich Orbeli

External links
 

1882 births
1958 deaths
Heroes of Socialist Labour
Full Members of the USSR Academy of Sciences
Academicians of the USSR Academy of Medical Sciences
S.M. Kirov Military Medical Academy alumni
Russian people of Armenian descent
Leon
People from Tsaghkadzor
Burials at Bogoslovskoe Cemetery
Soviet Armenians
Proceedings of the USSR Academy of Sciences editors